Intermittent fever is a type or pattern of fever in which there is an interval where temperature is elevated for several hours followed by an interval when temperature drops back to normal. This type of fever usually occurs during the course of an infectious disease. Diagnosis of intermittent fever is frequently based on the clinical history but some biological tests like complete blood count and blood culture are also used. In addition radiological investigations like chest X-ray, abdominal ultrasonography can also be used in establishing diagnosis.

Intermittent fever in malaria 
Malaria is a common cause of intermittent fever and it has following types.

Quotidian fever 
Bouts of fever occurring daily (24-hour periodicity) for a few hours, typical of Plasmodium knowlesi.

Tertian fever 
Fever occurs after an interval of two days (48-hour periodicity), typical of Plasmodium vivax and Plasmodium ovale.

Quartan fever 
Fever occurs after an interval of three days (72-hour periodicity), typical of Plasmodium malariae.

Examples

Infectious causes of intermittent fever 
The following are examples of infectious diseases that may feature intermittent fever.
 Malaria
 Tuberculosis
 Sepsis
 Kala azar
 Borreliosis (Lyme disease)
 Rat-bite fever
 Epstein-barr virus
 Chronic meningococcemia.

Inflammatory causes of intermittent fever 
Adult-onset Still's disease is an inflammatory disease that may cause intermittent fever, characteristically a quotidian fever that spikes once or twice in the late afternoon to evening.

Management 
Antipyretics like ibuprofen and paracetamol are used for fever and body aches. Antibiotics are also used for any underlying infection. For treating malaria, anti-malarial drugs like quinine, chloroquine and primaquine are given.

See also 
 Continuous fever
 Relapsing fever
 Undulant fever
 Remittent fever
 Neutropenic fever
 Cyclic fever; called Pel–Ebstein fever in Hodgkin's lymphoma

References 

 Fever
Malaria
Tuberculosis